St. Martin Parish is a parish located in the U.S. state of Louisiana, founded in 1811. Its parish seat is St. Martinville, and the largest city is Breaux Bridge. At the 2020 census, the population was 51,767. St. Martin Parish is part of the Lafayette metropolitan area in the region of Acadiana, along the Gulf Coast.

History
In 1811, parts of Attakapas Parish were taken out to create St. Martin and St. Mary parishes. In 1824, St. Martin Parish was divided, resulting in the creation also of Lafayette Parish. In 1844, St. Martin Parish was again divided, yielding Vermilion Parish. In 1868, Iberia Parish was formed from parts of St. Martin Parish and St. Mary Parish. St. Martin Parish was divided into two, as part of Iberia Parish runs between the two non-contiguous parts of St. Martin Parish.

St. Martin Parish was largely colonized in the 1700s by people from France and Acadia, resulting in a large concentration of French-speaking population today. The Acadians brought the tale of Evangeline, a young woman said to have been separated from her mortally wounded betrothed during their expulsion by the British from their territory in eastern Canada. According to the tale, Evangeline later met her betrothed again in St. Martin Parish, but he had already committed to a new love. Evangeline never recovered from the shock of both finding and losing him again. Poet Henry Wadsworth Longfellow's work, Evangeline, A Tale of Acadie, was based on this story.

Evangeline was and remains an icon of Acadian and American culture. The historical Evangeline, who is believed by some to have been an orphan girl named Emmeline Labiche, was purportedly buried on the grounds of St. Martin de Tours Catholic Church in St. Martinville.

St. Martin was a very prosperous parish, growing rapidly in the early 1800s. Most of the revenue at that time was being made by raising cattle. Other profitable crops were cotton, sugar, corn, rice and tobacco. These were sold to the New Orleans market. Wealthy planters used enslaved African Americans as labor on their plantations, and by 1860, there were over 7,000 slaves in the parish; there were also a large number of Anglo-American slaves brought to the parish.

A yellow fever epidemic in 1855, followed by a deadly fire and a destructive hurricane, ended an era of unbridled prosperity for elite whites. These events, combined with the effects of the American Civil War and Reconstruction took a heavy toll on the parish.

Geography
The parish of St. Martin is split into two non-contiguous parts because of a surveying error dating to 1868, when Iberia Parish was created by the Louisiana Legislature. Iberia Parish divides St. Martin Parish into two separate areas, Upper and Lower St. Martin. St. Martin Parish is in the Atchafalaya Basin, with Bayou Teche running through it. The bayou was used to ship products to New Orleans.

St. Martin Parish has a wealth of oak and magnolia trees.

Adjacent parishes
 Upper St. Martin
 Lafayette Parish  (west)
 St. Landry Parish  (north)
 Pointe Coupee Parish  (northeast)
 Iberville Parish  (east)
 Iberia Parish (south)
 Lower St. Martin

 Iberia Parish (north)
 Assumption Parish  (southeast)
 St. Mary Parish  (south)

Protected areas
The parish has both national and state protected areas within its borders.

National protected area
 Atchafalaya National Wildlife Refuge (part)

State protected areas
Part of the Attakapas Wildlife Management Area is located within St. Martin Parish as well as in St. Mary and Iberia parishes.

Communities

Cities 
 Breaux Bridge (largest municipality)
 Broussard (partial) 
 St. Martinville (parish seat)

Towns 
 Arnaudville
 Henderson

Village 
 Parks

Census-designated places 
 Cade
 Catahoula
 Cecilia

Unincorporated communities 
 Butte La Rose
 Coteau Holmes
 Gecko
 Nina Station
 Ruth

Demographics

At the 2000 United States census, there were 48,583 people, 17,164 households, and 12,975 families residing in the parish. The 2019 American Community Survey determined 53,732 people lived in St. Martin Parish. The median age of its population was 37.7, and 6.9% of its population were under 5 years of age; of the population aged 18 and older, they made up 75.7% of the population, and people aged 65 and older were 14.7% of the total population. By the 2020 United States census, there were 51,767 people, 19,749 households, and 13,960 families residing in the parish.

In 2000 the racial makeup of the parish was 65.95% White, 31.98% Black or African American, 0.92% Asian, 0.29% Native American, 0.20% from other races, and 0.65% from two or more races. Hispanics or Latino Americans of any race made up 0.83% of the population. The 2000 U.S. census counted 44,915 people in the parish who are at least five years old of whom 31,229 (69.5%) speak only English at home, 27.44% reported speaking French (Colonial French also known as Plantation Society French) or Cajun French at home, while 1.52% speak Louisiana Creole French. St. Martin has the highest percentage of French-speaking residents of any county or parish in the United States.

In 2019, the racial and ethnic makeup of St. Martin was 66.8% non-Hispanic white, 29.1% Black and African American, 0.6% American Indian and Alaska Native, 1.0% Asian, 0.5% some other race, 2.1% multiracial, and 3.0% Hispanic and Latino American of any race. An estimated 1.0% of the parish were foreign-born from 2014 to 2019. At the 2020 census, non-Hispanic whites declined to 63.59% of the population; Black or African Americans were 29.07% of the population, and Hispanic and Latino Americans made up 3.24% of the population.

In 2000 there were 17,164 households, out of which 39.70% had children under the age of 18 living with them, 54.60% were married couples living together, 15.90% had a female householder with no husband present, and 24.40% were non-families. 20.70% of all households were made up of individuals, and 7.90% had someone living alone who was 65 years of age or older.  The average household size was 2.78 and the average family size was 3.22. The median income for a household in the parish was $30,701, and the median income for a family was $36,316. Males had a median income of $30,701 versus $18,365 for females. The per capita income for the parish was $13,619.  About 18.40% of families and 21.50% of the population were below the poverty line, including 27.70% of those under age 18 and 22.10% of those age 65 or over. There were 19,749 households at the 2019 U.S. census estimates, and 4,800 businesses operating in the parish. The parish had an employment rate of 53.8%, and its population lived in 23,384 housing units. There was a median gross rent of $658 and the median household income was $48,656. Approximately 18.9% of the parish lived at or below the poverty line, and males earned $51,609 versus $32,748 for females from 2015 to 2019.

Education
Public schools in St. Martin Parish are operated by the St. Martin Parish School Board. South Louisiana Community College's service area includes the northern part and Fletcher Technical Community College's service area includes the southern part.

Politics

Transportation

Major highways 
  Interstate 10
  U.S. Highway 90
  Louisiana Highway 31
  Louisiana Highway 94
  Louisiana Highway 96
  Louisiana Highway 70
  Louisiana Highway 328
  Louisiana Highway 347
  Louisiana Highway 353

Notable people
 Ali Landry, Miss USA 1996 pageant winner
 Scott Angelle, director of the Bureau of Safety and Environmental Enforcement, former member of the Louisiana Public Service Commission, former lieutenant governor, unsuccessful candidate for governor in 2015
 Calvin Borel, American Thoroughbred Jockey and 3-time Kentucky Derby winner
 Gerald Boudreaux, state senator for St. Martin Parish, effective January 2016
 Etnah Rochon Boutte, French teacher, pharmacist in Harlem
 Jake Delhomme, retired NFL quarterback
 Charles Fuselier, sheriff of St. Martin Parish from 1980 to 2003; "National Sheriff of the Year" in 1996
 Jesse J. Guidry, state representative, former director of the Louisiana Department of Wildlife and Fisheries
 Mike "Pete" Huval, state representative; former member of the St. Martin Parish Council
 Jeff Landry, Attorney General of Louisiana; former U.S. representative
 Wade O. Martin, Jr., secretary of state
 James D. Simon, state senator

See also

 List of Louisiana Wildlife Management Areas

References

External links

 Official website
 St. Martin Parish Tourism Commission

Geology
 Heinrich, P. V., and W. J. Autin, 2000, Baton Rouge 30 x 60 minute geologic quadrangle. Louisiana Geological Survey, Baton Rouge, Louisiana.

 
1807 establishments in the Territory of Orleans
Parishes in Acadiana
Saint Martin Parish, Louisiana
Border irregularities of the United States
Lafayette metropolitan area, Louisiana
Saint Martin Parish, Louisiana
Populated places established in 1807